Solomon Kalushi Mahlangu (10 July 1956 – 6 April 1979) was a South African freedom fighter, struggle activist and operative of the African National Congress (ANC) militant wing, Umkhonto we Sizwe (MK). He was convicted of murder and  hanged in 1979.

Early years

Mahlangu was born in Pretoria on 10 July 1956, the second son of Martha Mahlangu. His father left in 1962 and as a result he was raised by his mother, a domestic worker. He attended Mamelodi High School up to Standard 8 (his tenth year of school), but his education was interrupted in 1976 by the riots of the Soweto uprising that resulted in school closures.

Military training
In 1976 Mahlangu fled to Mozambique and spent six months in a refugee camp near Xai Xai. From there he was taken to an African National Congress (ANC) training camp called "Engineering", in Angola. There and at Funda Camp he received training in sabotage, military combat, scouting and politics. He, George 'Lucky' Mahlangu and Mondy Motloung were then taken to Swaziland, where they were given large suitcases filled with pamphlets, rifles and hand grenades. On 11 June 1977 they crossed the border into South Africa and started making their way to Johannesburg.

Arrest
The three comrades-in-arms, each carrying a large suitcase, were climbing into a taxi in Diagonal Street in the centre of Johannesburg. An ordinary policeman became suspicious and grabbed one of the suitcases. An AK-47 assault rifle and a hand grenade fell out. All three of them fled. In the ensuing gun battle, two civilian men were killed and another two wounded. Mahlangu and Motaung were eventually arrested.

Trial and sentence
Mahlangu's trial started in the Supreme Court on 7 November 1977. He was defended by two advocates, Messrs Ismail Mohamed, S.C. and Clifford Mailer. They faced two counts of murder, two counts of attempted murder and various counts under the Terrorism Act. In its judgment the court found that Mahlangu and Motaung had acted with a common purpose and that it consequently did not matter which of the two had done the shooting and killing. Mahlangu was convicted on all counts. In terms of the South African law, the court was obliged to sentence an accused to death for murder, unless the accused proved mitigating circumstances. The court found that Mahlangu had failed to do so, and consequently handed down the death sentence. The court refused Mahlangu leave to appeal. His lawyers then asked the Appeal Court for leave to appeal and it was again refused.

Mahlangu was hanged on 6 April 1979. Before going to the gallows he reportedly said: "Tell my people that I love them and that they must continue the fight, my blood will nourish the tree that will bear the fruits of freedom, A luta continua."

Truth and Reconciliation Commission
The commission examined the cases of Solomon Mahlangu and Monty Motaung and found that both of them were responsible for the deaths of Rupert Kessner and Kenneth Wolfendale. It also found both Mahlangu and Motaung guilty of gross human rights violations. Lastly it found both the African National Congress and the commanding officer of Umkhonto we Sizwe guilty of gross human rights violations.

Legacy
Solomon Mahlangu is commemorated in the Solomon Mahlangu Freedom Square in his hometown of Mamelodi, Pretoria. The square is focused on a bronze statue of Mahlangu.

In the city of Durban, there was a major arterial road named 'Edwin Swales VC Drive', after a RAF bomber commander who died in 1945. Following proposals made by the eThekwini Municipality, the road was changed to honour Mahlangu.

A main arterial road in Pretoria that runs through Solomon Mahlangu's hometown of Mamelodi was renamed from Hans Strijdom Drive to Solomon Mahlangu Drive.

In 2016, the main administrative building at the University of the Witwatersrand, formerly known as Senate House, was renamed Solomon Mahlangu House.

The 2017 film Kalushi chronicles his life and times, where Thabo Rametsi made the role of Solomon.

In Tanzania, one of the top universities, Sokoine University of Agriculture, in the east region of Morogoro, one of the two campuses in Morogoro town, is known as Solomon Mahlangu Campus.

During the FeesMustFall protests, "Solomon" was a key song recited by student activists on campuses across the country. This is a reference to Mahlangu, his legacy and what he means to the youth of today.

In 2019 the Nelson Mandela University in Port Elizabeth renamed one of their residences after him.

In 2022 Rhodes University in Makhanda renamed Jan Smuts Hall, the largest residence on campus, after him.

The Transvaal Scottish Regiment was renamed the Solomon Mahlangu Regiment after him.

See also 
 Andrew Zondo
 Siphiwe Mvuyane

References

1956 births
1979 deaths
People from Mamelodi
UMkhonto we Sizwe personnel
People convicted of murder by South Africa
South African people convicted of murder
Executed South African people
People executed by South Africa by hanging
20th-century executions by South Africa
Order of Mendi for Bravery